Mud Island Amphitheater is a 5,000-seat concrete outdoor amphitheater located on Mud Island, a peninsula in Memphis, Tennessee. The structure has been used for concerts and shows since it was built in 1982. A few artists that have performed at Mud Island Amphitheater include Bob Dylan, Journey, Eric Clapton, Heart and Peter Frampton.

References

External links
 

Amphitheaters in the United States
Music venues completed in 1982
Music venues in Tennessee
1982 establishments in Tennessee